General elections were held in Cuba on 1 June 1944. Ramón Grau San Martín won the presidential election running under the Auténtico-Republican Alliance banner, whilst the Partido Auténtico emerged as the largest party in the House of Representatives, winning 19 of the 70 seats.

Results

President

Senate

House of Representatives

References

Cuba
General
Presidential elections in Cuba
Parliamentary elections in Cuba
Cuba
Election and referendum articles with incomplete results